Robert Carter (1791 – May 25, 1872) was a Newfoundland naval officer and political figure.

He was born in Ferryland, the son of judge William Carter, and joined the Royal Navy as a young man, retiring as a lieutenant in 1815. Later that year, he was named surrogate magistrate after the death of his brother William, serving until 1826. In 1832, Carter was elected to represent Ferryland in the first general election held in Newfoundland. He was defeated in 1836, but went on to represent Bonavista Bay from 1842 to 1852 and from 1855 to 1859 and Fortune Bay from 1859 to 1865.

Carter also served as a road commissioner for Ferryland and as supervisor of streets for St. John's from 1846 to 1848. In 1849, he was named colonial treasurer and governor of the Newfoundland Savings Bank; he held on to these posts until he was forced out of office by Governor Sir Charles Henry Darling in 1855. Carter served as colonial secretary from 1861 to 1865, retiring from politics later that year. He died in St John's in 1872.

External links 
Biography at the Dictionary of Canadian Biography Online

1791 births
1872 deaths
Members of the Newfoundland and Labrador House of Assembly
Newfoundland Colony people
Colonial Secretaries of Newfoundland